Badonviller is a commune in the Meurthe-et-Moselle department in northeastern France.

Geography

Climate

Badonviller has a oceanic climate (Köppen climate classification Cfb).

Population

Personalities
It is the birth town of the astronomer Charles Messier (1730–1817).

See also
Communes of the Meurthe-et-Moselle department
Badonviller March
Badenweiler, Germany
Antoine Sartorio

References

Communes of Meurthe-et-Moselle